Beilschmiedia preussii is a species of plant in the family Lauraceae. It is endemic to Cameroon.  Its natural habitat is subtropical or tropical dry forests. It is threatened by habitat loss.

References

Flora of Cameroon
preussii
Critically endangered plants
Taxonomy articles created by Polbot